Habaspuri is a cotton-based traditional handloom textiles of Odisha, India. Habaspuri sari is a major product of this textile. The Bhulia weavers of Chicheguda, Kalahandi district, Odisha are originally attributed for weaving of the Habaspuri fabric. For its uniqueness in weaving, design and production, it has been identified as one of the 14 Geographical Indications of Odisha. The textile has traditional patterns of the region like kumbha (temple), fish and flowers.

Etymology 
Habaspuri handloom is named after the village of Habaspur in Kalahandi district where it was originally woven during 19 CE.

Chicheguda 
Weaver families in the village of Chicheguda village have worked on reviving the Habaspuri handloom.

Production and sales 
The Habaspuri saris and other textile products produced by the individual weavers and groups are marketed and sold by the Handlooms, Textiles and Handlooms Department of the Government of Odisha in the government-run stores.

References 

Geographical indications in Odisha
Economy of Odisha
Odia culture
Textile arts of India
Figured fabrics
Kalahandi district
Handloom sarees